Nier is an action role-playing video game developed by Cavia and published by Square Enix for the PlayStation 3 and Xbox 360 in April 2010. A remaster of the game,  was released for PlayStation 4, Xbox One, and Windows on April 23, 2021.

The game is a spin-off from the Drakengard series, and follows the fifth ending of the first game, the events of which have left the planet Earth in a state of decay. Set over one thousand years after this, the game puts the player in control of the protagonist as he attempts to find a cure for an illness, known as the Black Scrawl, to which Yonah—either his sister or daughter, depending on the version—has succumbed. Partnering with a talking book known as Grimoire Weiss, he journeys with two other characters, Kainé and Emil, as he attempts to find a remedy and understand the nature of the creatures known as Shades that stalk the world. The gameplay borrows elements from various video game genres, occasionally switching between them and the main role-playing-based gameplay. Nier was designed to have gameplay that would appeal to players outside of Japan, where Cavia is based; additionally, the Gestalt version of the game has an older main character for the same reason. The music was composed by Keiichi Okabe, head of Monaca, a music composition studio, and several albums have been released.

Nier was released to mixed reception; reviewers praised the story, characters and soundtrack and were mixed in their opinions of how well the disparate gameplay elements were connected. The execution of some gameplay elements was criticized, notably the side quests, and the graphics were regarded as substandard. Despite this, the game acquired acclaim among players over time, becoming a cult classic. The original Nier sold 500,000 copies, while the updated version shipped 1.5 million copies worldwide. A sequel developed by PlatinumGames, titled Nier: Automata, was released in 2017.

Gameplay

Players take control of a middle-aged man in Nier Gestalt and a teenage boy in Nier Replicant, named by the player. The player directly controls the main character through a third-person perspective to interact with people, objects, and enemies throughout the game. The player can turn the camera around the characters, which allows for a 360° view of the surroundings. The three-dimensional world is divided into areas separated by loading screens, and the player can move freely throughout these areas by walking, running, jumping, and climbing ladders. In some rooms and buildings, the camera swings to the side and the main character is restricted to moving as in a two-dimensional platforming environment, while during certain battles the camera pulls up to simulate a top-down shoot 'em up or other video game genres.

While traveling the player is frequently attacked by monsters, which include shadowy figures called Shades, large animals, and robots. Defeating these enemies gives the player experience points that can increase the main character's power, and money that can be used to purchase items. The main character can attack these creatures with either a one- or two-handed sword, or a spear. These weapons can be customized to have greater damage and abilities using materials that can be purchased, dropped from monsters, or scavenged around the world. Multiple different varieties of each weapon type can be acquired. The player can also use magic spells, which require enough energy from a constantly regenerating amount to cast. These spells include projectiles and large shadowy fists, among others; new spells are acquired in the first half of the game by completing specific battles. In addition to the main plotline, Nier includes numerous sidequests, which give the player experience points and money, as well as fishing and farming segments.

Plot
The game opens with a prologue during the summer of 2049 (2053 in Replicant) in a snowstorm. In a modern, broken-down grocery store, the protagonist fends off attacks from ethereal monsters to protect the sick Yonah—either his younger sister or daughter, depending on the version. After defeating the monsters, he checks on Yonah, who has begun to cough badly. The game cuts to 1,312 years later (1,412 years in Replicant), where the protagonist and Yonah are living in a village built upon the ruins of an old town. The low-technology village is one of several, and is surrounded by more modern ruins such as the remnants of train tracks and industrial machinery. The areas between towns are filled with monsters known as Shades that attack travelers.

As Yonah's illness, the Black Scrawl, is terminal, the protagonist sets out to look for a cure. He finds a talking book, Grimoire Weiss, which suggests that the two team up to use Weiss' magic and to find a cure for Yonah's disease. In their search, they encounter Kainé, a hot-tempered and foul-mouthed swordswoman; and Emil, a blindfolded boy whose eyes petrify anyone they see. After journeying for a time, the village is attacked by a giant shade; the battle culminates in Yonah being carried away by a master Shade that appears—the Shadowlord—who carries his own book, Grimoire Noir.

The game jumps five years forward. The protagonist and the others are trying to find the parts to a key that they believe will help them locate the Shadowlord and Grimoire Noir. After defeating five Shades and assembling the key, the team go to defeat the Shadowlord. There, Devola and Popola, characters who have been guiding the protagonist on his quest, appear to try to stop them. They explain that over 1300 years prior, humanity faced extinction due to an incurable disease. In an attempt to survive, they separated their souls from their bodies using Grimoire Noir and Weiss. They created clones resistant to the disease, Replicants, and intended to recombine the souls, or Gestalts, with the Replicant bodies once the disease had died out; Devola and Popola were androids set to oversee the project. Over time, the Replicants had begun to form their own identities; while the Gestalts, or Shades, had grown aggressive to them.

The protagonist defeats the pair, with Emil sacrificing himself to ensure his friends' progress. The remaining group then defeats the Shadowlord. It is revealed that the Shadowlord's true identity is the Gestalt form of the protagonist from the prologue; the protagonist the player has been controlling for the majority of the game is his Replicant. Driven to protect his Yonah, he was the first Gestalt and has combined her with the Replicant Yonah. The original Yonah, however, tells the Gestalt protagonist that she can hear the new Yonah inside her, and that she loves the Replicant protagonist and deserves the body just as much. She vacates the body, and the protagonist and Yonah are reunited.

If the player plays the game again, they start just after the five-year skip. They learn about Kainé's past, including that she is intersex, which along with the death of her parents resulted in her ostracism as a child, and that she is partially possessed by a Shade. The player gains the ability to understand what the shades are saying, including the one possessing Kainé, though in-game the protagonist, Weiss, and Emil are still unable to. Additional cutscenes are also shown, giving the motivations and backstory behind the Shade bosses that are fought and showing them as sentient people trying to defend their friends against the protagonist. The ending to the second playthrough shows that Emil survives his sacrifice, and that the Gestalt protagonist and Yonah are reunited in the afterlife. A third or further playthrough presents the player with a choice in the ending to save Kainé, who is seen to be dying in agony; the protagonist can either kill her to end her suffering (the third ending), or sacrifice his life for her (the fourth ending). The latter choice not only erases all memory of him from the other characters' minds, shown in a final cutscene, but also deletes all of the player's saved progress, as if the game had never been played. Moreover, if the player wants to start a new game, they will be unable to enter the same name chosen for the previous playthrough for the protagonist.

The updated version of Replicant adds a fifth ending that occurs after a new game is begun following the fourth ending, beginning following the defeat of Kainé's Shade nemesis Hook. Three years after the Shadowlord's defeat, Kainé continues having nightmares about losing something precious, and fights increasingly-hostile Shades. Going to the Forest of Myth to investigate its sudden silence, she finds everyone killed by machines emerging from its central tree, revealed to be the control unit recording Replicant memories, its AI communicating with Kainé through twin childlike avatars. Kainé is aided in fighting past machine duplicates of her by Emil, eventually entering the tree's mainframe and battling enemies drawn from her memories, culminating in a battle with a more-powerful Hook helped by the data remains of Grimoire Weiss. Kainé destroys Hook and the AI, restoring the protagonist in his young form; all of the player's save data prior to the fourth ending is consequently restored.

Development
The concept that would become Nier was first proposed following the release of Drakengard 2 and the reveal of seventh generation consoles. The original concept was for a third entry in the Drakengard series. It was intended to be for the PlayStation 3 due to the lessening importance of the PlayStation 2, which Drakengard 2 had been made for. However, as the project evolved, the original ideas were reworked and the game eventually became a spin-off from the main series. Despite this, the game's director Yoko Taro continues to think of it as the third Drakengard game. Including concept planning, the total development time lasted three years, with two years spent actually developing the game. It was initially a small-scale project, but during planning it grew into a full-fledged role-playing game. Development was handled by Cavia with help from Square Enix, who had previously provided development support for the Drakengard games. Square Enix had minimal input on Yoko's vision for the game's atmosphere and story, allowing him high creative control. The in-game cutscenes were created and directed by Studio Anima.

Nier is intended to be set over 1000 years after the events of Drakengard'''s fifth ending. In this scenario, the game's protagonists Caim and Angelus travel across a dimensional boundary to fight a monstrous beast. After winning the battle and killing the monster, they are shot down by a fighter jet and killed; their introduction of magic to the world leads to magical research that results in the Black Scrawl. According to Yoko, after the dark story of Drakengard, Yoko focused on more positive themes of friendship and combined effort. Much of the game was inspired by the September 11 attacks and the War on Terror. Yoko took from it the idea of a terrible event where both sides believed they were doing the right thing, and wanted to show the player multiple perspectives of the same events. The term "Replicant" was borrowed by Yoko from the 1982 science fiction movie Blade Runner, although Yoko did not cite a particular source for Niers name, passing it off as a codename that persisted through development.

The characters were designed by an artist under the moniker D.K. Two character designs for the protagonist were created for Nier. The developers believed that the Japanese audience would respond more strongly to a younger protagonist, while non-Japanese audiences would prefer an adult protagonist character. Other than changing the protagonists appearance and modifying a few lines of dialogue to fit with him being a father rather than a brother to Yonah, the developers made no changes between the two versions; it was initially believed that the older protagonist was the character's original design. Many characters underwent changes during development, and some needed to be cut: there were originally thirteen Grimoires, with all but three being cut: those that remained were Weiss, Noir and Rubrum. Emil's character was derived from a female character named Halua, while Kainé was originally a far more feminine type who hid her violent nature. Yonah's original Japanese name was derived from the Biblical name Jonah: this could not be taken verbatim into its localized form due to the name being associated with a man, so the name was changed to "Yonah". Yoko was initially shocked at Kainé's design, but warmed to it and had it kept. Kainé's character was made intersex, since the team felt it fit in with many other aspects of her gritty backstory. Kainé's status as intersex caused some "commotion" in western territories, which is something the team did not actively intend. Yoko attributed the original suggestion to female staff members working on the game.

The combat and action elements of Nier were inspired by the God of War series of games, which both Taro and Saito enjoyed. While the games had not been as popular in Japan as in North America, the two felt that the idea of having boss fights with different combat styles than the regular battles was an idea that would appeal to players in both regions. The changing styles, as well as the occasional changes in camera angle and movement, were meant to "accentuate [the] gap between real, modern scenery and the fantasy world" as a tie-in to the game's story. The game was designed to have gameplay that would appeal to non-Japanese players in mind, with producer Saito stating that they wanted to depart from menu-based combat. The game was meant to appeal to older players; it was intended as an action-role playing game (RPG) for an older market than Square Enix's action-RPG series Kingdom Hearts. This influenced the decision to have a main character in his 30s for the international version, as well as more blood and swearing than typical in a Square Enix RPG. The fusion of different gameplay styles was included as a homage to earlier gameplay styles and genres.Nier was originally intended to be exclusive to the Xbox 360, but after deciding to also develop the game for PlayStation 3, the developers decided to further divide the Japanese release of the game. Nier Gestalt would be released for the Xbox 360, featuring the adult lead (as in the international release for both platforms), while Nier Replicant, for the PlayStation 3, would feature the young lead. The localizations for the game—in English, French, and German—were produced during development so that all of the versions could be released at the same time, and so that Cavia and Square Enix could solicit feedback from North America and Europe on the game so that it would appeal to players outside Japan. Nier was officially unveiled in June 2009 at the Electronic Entertainment Expo 2009 for both the PlayStation 3 and Xbox 360, to be developed by Cavia and published by Square Enix. Due to its high violence, the game was given a CERO D rating in Japan.

Music

The soundtrack to Nier was composed by a collaboration of the studio MoNACA, directed by Keiichi Okabe and including Kakeru Ishihama and Keigo Hoashi, and Takafumi Nishimura from Cavia. Okabe served as the lead composer and as the director for the project as a whole. Okabe was brought onto the project when the concept for the game was first being devised, and worked intermittently on the soundtrack for the next three years until its release. The music for the game was generally composed entirely separately from the development of the game. The music was designed for different motifs to appear in various arrangements throughout the soundtrack, and also to convey a sense of sadness even during the "thrilling" tracks. Okabe was allowed a great deal of freedom regarding what the music was to sound like; game director Yoko Taro's main request was that he use a lot of vocal works.

The soundtrack to Nier is largely composed of melancholy acoustic pieces which heavily feature vocals by vocalist Emi Evans (Emiko Rebecca Evans), a singer from England living in Tokyo. She is the singer for the band freesscape, and had previously worked on video games such as Etrian Odyssey. In addition to singing, Evans was asked to write her own lyrics in futuristic languages. The composers gave her preliminary version of songs and the style they wished the language to be in, such as Gaelic or French, and she invented the words. Evans wrote songs in versions of Gaelic, Portuguese, Spanish, Italian, French, English and Japanese, where she tried to imagine what they would sound like after 1000 years of drifting.

Square Enix released a soundtrack album of music from the game, titled Nier Gestalt & Replicant Original Soundtrack, on April 21, 2010. The soundtrack album reached number 24 on the Japanese Oricon music charts, and remained on the charts for 11 weeks. As preorder bonuses for Nier Gestalt and Nier Replicant, two mini-albums, Nier Gestalt Mini Album and Nier Replicant Mini Album, were included. An album of arranged music, NieR Gestalt & Replicant 15 Nightmares & Arrange Tracks, was published by Square Enix on December 8, 2010. The arranged album reached number 59 on the Oricon music charts, a position it held for a week. Another album, NieR Tribute Album -echo-, was released on September 14, 2011, and an album of piano arrangements, Piano Collections Nier Gestalt & Replicant, was published on March 21, 2012.

Remaster
An updated version of Replicant titled Nier Replicant ver.1.22474487139... was announced in March 2020 as part of the 10th anniversary celebrations for the series and was slated for a worldwide release for PlayStation 4, Xbox One, and Windows. It was released on April 22, 2021, in Asia, and April 23 in the West. Yosuke Saito returns as the producer, and Yoko Taro remains as the writer, with the role of director being passed to Saki Ito. Development was handled by Toylogic. ver.1.22474487139... features new Japanese voicework to make the game fully voiced, and both new and rearranged music from the original composer.

The combat redesign was supervised by Takahisa Taura of PlatinumGames, who had worked on Nier: Automata. Toylogic was brought on board due to Yoko knowing its founder, Yoichi Take, from their time working together at Cavia. Kazuma Koda, who worked on later Nier projects, contributed promotional artwork. The characters were redrawn by Akihiko Yoshida, Toshiyuki Itahana, and Kimihiko Fujisaka; all three had contributed to the Drakengard and Nier series, and were brought in at Yoko's request. The game included new story content, content creating a narrative link to its sequel, and story content originally cut from the game. It also featured an appearance and role for the father protagonist used in the original Western release. Most of the English original cast returned, including Laura Bailey (Kaine), Liam O'Brien (Grimoire Weiss), Julie Ann Taylor (Emil), and Eden Riegel (Devola and Popola). The protagonist had two voice actors; Zach Aguilar voiced the younger version, while Ray Chase voiced the older version after the time skip.

Reception
Initial releaseNier Gestalt sold over 12,500 copies in Japan the week of its release, while Replicant sold over 60,000 and was the top-selling video game in Japan that week. Replicant sold over 121,000 copies in Japan by the end of May 2010, and ended the year with over 134,000 copies sold. In 2019, Yoko estimated that Nier had sold around 500,000 copies worldwide. According to Yoko, "we weren't really in the red, but it wasn't exactly a success either".Nier received mixed reviews. Reviewers criticized the graphics, with Ryan Clements of IGN saying that "one of Nier's greatest flaws is its visuals," while GameSpot Kevin VanOrd bemoaned the "flavorless visuals" and "lifeless environments". Dustin Quillen of 1UP.com said that the game "looks downright primitive", while Adriaan den Ouden of RPGamer, who awarded the game a higher score than most, said that "the environments are bland and poorly rendered". The music and voice acting, however, were praised; Clements said that "both are quite excellent", den Ouden called the soundtrack "absolutely fantastic", Chris Schilling of Eurogamer said that the music was full of "memorable themes", and one of the four reviewers for the Japanese Weekly Famitsu termed it "a cut above".

Reviewers were divided in their opinion on the effectiveness of the multiple styles of gameplay presented. Seth Schiesel of The New York Times said that while "there are plenty of games that surpass it in each area," that Nier pulled all of the styles together into a "coherent, compelling whole" instead of feeling "disjointed"; he especially praised a section of the game that is presented entirely through text. Patrick Kolan of IGN Australia, however, said that while the different styles were "interesting" and one of the game's biggest strengths, they suffered from poor execution and cohesion and left the game "with split-personality disorder". Clements said that "the developers' ideas sometimes outshine the actual implementation", while highlighting the gameplay elements as part of what made the game fun. Adriaan den Ouden called out the variety as the best part of the game, likening it to a buffet table, while also acknowledging that none of the sections were "amazing" on their own and could easily be looked upon poorly.

The regular combat was reviewed as solid, if not exceptional, and the sidequests were seen as repetitive, with Quillen saying that "the side quests in Nier are about as numerous as they are totally mindless," VanOrd calling them "a series of monotonous events, often connected only by long stretches of nothing," and a Famitsu reviewer saying that they "didn't see much purpose" to them. Clements said that the combat had "a fair amount of satisfaction", though players should "not expect anything too extraordinary", and Kolan termed the combat as "moderately deep". Critics gave a generally positive review to the plot and characters; VanOrd liked most of the characters but thought Nier was bland and the story "soggy", while Schiesel called the story "provocative" and "profound", saying that it "succeeds at fostering an emotional investment in its characters and in its world". Quillen said that the plot "takes some fascinating and truly original turns" and that Nier has "a supporting cast of genuinely interesting folks," and Schilling said that the story made the game "difficult to dislike". The Famitsu reviewer that viewed the game the most favorably said that he was "blown away" by the multiple endings, and that "nothing like it's been done in gaming".

In 2015, Jeffrey Matulef of Eurogamer characterized Nier as "the rare game that gets better with age". Despite "poor sales and tepid reviews", he wrote, the game had acquired a cult following, which he attributed to its "sense of wonder" due to its cryptic storytelling, mashup assortment of game mechanics and melancholy mood.

Replicant ver.1.22474487139...

The updated version of NieR Replicant received generally positive reviews. Critics praised the graphic and combat improvements over the original Nier.

By June 2021, Replicant ver 1.22474487139... had shipped over one million copies worldwide in both physical and digital sales, double the estimates for the original version. Replicant ver 1.22474487139... won the "Best Score/Music" category at The Game Awards 2021. As of November 2022, Replicant ver 1.22474487139... has shipped 1.5 million copies worldwide.

Legacy
On May 11, 2010, Square Enix released a piece of downloadable content for the game, titled "The World of Recycled Vessel". The small expansion features a series of fifteen battles with the incarnation of Nier other than the one in the specific version of the game. Nier enters the battles in a dream world accessed through a diary in his house. The expansion offers new costumes and weapons for the game. Square Enix executive producer Yosuke Saito later commented that "a number of things" related to Nier were in progress, and that an announcement could be due in 2011. The only announcement ended up not being for a new Nier video game, but instead for a live evening concert for Nier's music titled "Nier Night ~ Evening of Madness" which took place on October 28, 2011.Nier was the last game that Cavia made; the company was absorbed into its parent company, AQ Interactive, in July 2010. In March 2011, there were plans made between Yoko and Takuya Iwasaki, one of the original producers for Drakengard, to develop a port of Nier for the PlayStation Vita at Iwasaki's company Orca. The port would have incorporated material from both versions of the game. When Orca was chosen to help develop Dragon Quest X, the project was shelved. A number of key staff from Niers development, including director Yoko and Okabe, would later reunite to work on a new entry (Drakengard 3) in the Drakengard series from which Nier was spun off.

A sequel titled Nier: Automata, developed by Square Enix and PlatinumGames for the PlayStation 4, was released in Japan on February 23, in North America on March 7 and worldwide on March 10, 2017. The PC version of Nier: Automata was released on March 17, 2017. The Xbox One version was released on June 26, 2018. The Nintendo Switch version was released on October 6, 2022. Yoko, Saito and Okabe returned to their previous roles. Other staff members include Yoshida as lead artist and producer Atsushi Inaba. A mobile game, Nier Reincarnation, produced by Applibot, with Yoshida returning to design the characters, was released on February 18, 2021.

A crossover event with Square Enix's SINoALICE mobile game was announced in June 2021. The event consisted of a game level in SINoAlice'' titled "Nier Replicant: Dream Under Missing Pages", with story from Yoko Taro, and ran for the first time from June 22, 2021 to July 6, 2021.

A new edition of the game artbook will release on August 29, 2023.

Notes

See also 
 Celestial Alphabet

References

Further reading

External links

2010 video games
Action role-playing video games
Cancelled PlayStation Vita games
Cavia (company) games
Drakengard
Dystopian video games
Extinction in fiction
Fantasy video games
Open-world video games
Fiction set in 2049
Fiction set in the 4th millennium
Hack and slash role-playing games
PlayStation 3 games
PlayStation 4 games
Post-apocalyptic video games
Postmodern works
Single-player video games
Square Enix games
Video game spin-offs
Video games about skeletons
Video games developed in Japan
Video games scored by Keiichi Okabe
Video games set in the 2040s
Video games with alternate endings
Video games with alternative versions
Video games with downloadable content
Windows games
Xbox 360 games
Xbox One games